1951 Meistaradeildin was the ninth season of Meistaradeildin, the top tier of the Faroese football league system. TB Tvøroyri won its third league title in the season.

Overview

Results

External links
Faroe Islands League Final Tables
RSSSF

Meistaradeildin seasons
Faroe
Faroe